Asymphyloptera is a genus of flies in the family Empididae.

Species
A. discrepans Collin, 1933
A. quadriseta Smith, 1961

References

Empidoidea genera
Empididae